Phạm Đức Lĩnh is a senior officer in the Vietnam People's Army. He is a lieutenant general, general director of the Vietnam Marine Police from 2006 to 2012 and also a congressman in the National Assembly of Vietnam.

Biography
Pham Duc Linh was born in Gia Lạc, Gia Viễn District, Ninh Bình Province. He is the first military officer appointed lieutenant general in Vietnam Marine Police.

Vietnam Marine Police
As the general director of Vietnam Marine Police, he has confirmed Vietnam Marine Police's mission in The 7th Meeting of Heads of Asia Coast Guard Agencies (HACGAM) to be held in Hanoi 2011: "The Vietnam Marine Police Force will be strengthened to ensure security, order and safety in the territorial waters and the exclusive economic zone of Vietnam. We have dispatched more Vietnam Marine Police to the sea especially in overlapping areas between Vietnam and foreign countries. Local fishermen will be better protected and assisted if necessary. We also remind local fishermen not to cross into the waters of foreign countries".

In 2011, when China started deploying staging huge oil and gas exploration rig named CNOOC 981 in "Biển đông", Linh confirmed that protecting natural resources of oil and gas exploration on the coast of Vietnam is the responsibility of the Vietnam Marine Police. Recently, PetroVietnam has been concerned. The Ministry of Defence has assigned the Vietnam People's Navy and Vietnam Marine Police the responsibility to protect oil and gas activities in Vietnamese territorial waters. If oil and gas resources are owned by Vietnam, Vietnam will protect those areas at any cost.

Vietnam is a member of the United Nations Convention on the Law of the Sea (UNCLOS), Vietnam implements its membership responsibilities, and asks others to do the same. All members must uphold UNCLOS. To develop Vietnam's marine strategy, Linh emphasizes the necessity to equip the Vietnam Marine Police with helicopters, more modern ships that can operate for a long time on the high seas in bad weather conditions. Modern ships will be equipped to launch rescue activities capable of providing first aid to more than 100 people. Capacity building for the staff is also among his priorities. In early 2012, the Vietnam Marine Police will be equipped with one large ship, which can operate for 40 days in bad weather.

References

Vietnamese military personnel
Vietnamese generals
Living people
Year of birth missing (living people)